Route 58 is a  road that stretches from Route 50 in Lihue to the junction of Wapaa Road with Hawaii 51 near Nawiliwili Harbor on Kauai island.

Route description 
Route 58 begins at an intersection with Route 50 at the Kukui Grove Shopping Center, one of the few major shopping areas on Kauai island.  Called Nawiliwili road, it heads southeast and loses the grassy median to become a two lane road. Route 58 comes to an end at Wapaa Road while Route 51 (Rice Street) continues back north from the coast. About halfway down route 58 is the Grove Farm Museum.
From the southern end of route 58, Niumalu Road provides access to Nawiliwili Beach Park and Niumalu Beach Park.

Major intersection

References

External links

 

Transportation in Kauai County, Hawaii
0058